Chris Heiberg (born 1 June 1985) is a South African rugby union player, playing with Australian side the . His regular position is prop.

Career
He spent his career playing for university club side  - including playing in the 2010 Varsity Cup competition.

He played a further six games in that season and in May 2013, he was called into the  team for the 2013 Super Rugby season.

Super Rugby Statistics

References

1985 births
South African rugby union players
Western Province (rugby union) players
Rugby union props
Rugby union players from Cape Town
Living people
Perth Spirit players
South African expatriate rugby union players
South African expatriate sportspeople in Australia
Expatriate rugby union players in Australia
Western Force players
Alumni of Wynberg Boys' High School
Southern Kings players
Eastern Province Elephants players
Stormers players